"Olly olly oxen free" is a catchphrase or truce term used in children's games such as hide and seek, capture the flag, and kick the can  to indicate that players who are hiding can come out into the open without losing the game; that the position of the sides in a game has changed (as in which side is on the field or which side is at bat or "up" in baseball or kickball); or, alternatively, that the game is entirely over.

The origin of the phrase is unknown. The Dictionary of American Regional English says the phrase may be derived from all ye, all ye outs in free, all the outs in free, or possibly ”calling all the outs in free”; in other words, all who are out may come in without penalty. Others speculate the phrase may be a corruption of a hypothetical and ungrammatical German phrase alle, alle, auch sind frei (all, all, also are free).

A number of variations exist. "Ollyoxalls" is one such variant, said to be used in Portsmouth, England. Another variant is "Ollie Ollie in come free."

In popular culture 
Various songs are named "Olly olly oxen free", or a variant thereof, including songs by: the Ted Weems orchestra (sung by a young Perry Como); Terry Scott Taylor, on his 2004 album Imaginarium: Songs from the Neverhood; the metalcore band Sworn In, on their 2015 album The Lovers/The Devil; and Amanda Palmer, on her 2012 album Theatre Is Evil.
 Olly Olly Oxen Free (1978) is a film starring Katharine Hepburn,
 Oxenfree is a 2016 videogame by Night School Studio.
At the very end of Peter, Paul and Mary's recording of "It's Raining", they speak the more straightforward version of the phrase: "All-ee, all-ee in free."
In  Kurt Vonnegut’s 1962 novel Mother Night, the phrase’s use among children is referenced, as the narrator desires to hear an analogous message to come out of hiding. 
On Victoria Williams' 1994 album Loose, the song "Polish Your Shoes" features the line "Olly olly oxen free, but be careful."
In the Peanuts comic strip for October 3, 1955, Lucy hollers "Olee Olee Olsen Free-O!" Violet informs her chagrined friend that it should be "Ally ally out are in free!"
The punk band Authority Zero released an album called Ollie Ollie Oxen Free in 2021.
The 2017 film XXX: Return of Xander Cage, Toni Collette's character says it to signal a truce after a faux tactical raid designed to re-recruit Xander.
In the 1986 film, Police Academy 3: Back in Training, Bud is searching for Eugene Tackleberry and calls Ollie Ollie Oxen Free as a desperate attempt to get his brother-in-law to come out of hiding.
In the 1999 video game Bugs Bunny: Lost in Time, Bugs Bunny calls out the phrase whenever the super-jump ability is activated.
In the 1948 film A Connecticut Yankee in King Arthur's Court, Hank Martin, transported back to the 6th century in Camelot and posing as a magician sorcerer to the king, uses the phrase as a pseudo magic charm or spell, to call back the light of the sun during the last moments of an eclipse, after having threatened to blot it out forever.
In the Seinfeld episode "The Pool Guy", Newman yells "oly oly oxen free!" before doing a cannonball and nearly drowning Ramon the pool guy.
In The Vampire Diaries episode "The New Deal", as Damon and Elena enter the building, Damon says, "Come on, Stef. Olly Olly Oxen Free." 
The song "Downtown" on Macklemore & Ryan Lewis's 2016 album This Unruly Mess I've Made, features the phrase "I mean, water ski, ollie ollie oxen free".
In the 2020 Netflix miniseries The Haunting of Bly Manor, the character Dani Clayton uses the phrase "Ollie Ollie oxen free" during a game of hide and seek with the children.
The phrase appears in the video game franchise Halo as the SPARTAN-II supersoldiers' all-clear signal.
The phrase appears in the song "Bad Girls Club" by the band Falling In Reverse, released in 2013.
A variation of the phrase, "Olly Oxen Free", appears in the 2017 song "The Dirt Bike", by Astronautalis
 The phrase appears in the chorus of the track "Capture The Flag" on Black Map's 2022 album Melodoria
 The phrase is chanted in "Kick the Can", a 1962 episode of The Twilight Zone, by the character Charles Whitley (played by Ernest Truex).
 The R.E.M song "Drive" contains the lyrics "Ollie, Ollie, Ollie, Ollie, Ollie. Ollie, Ollie in come free, baby".
 In Thirteen Reasons Why, it is the catchphrase used by Hannah, Jessica, and Alex.
 In the Mad Men episode "Nixon Vs. Kennedy", the character Kenneth Cosgrove yells “Olly olly oxen free!” after his boss leaves the office, signaling to his coworkers that they are free to begin their election night party.
 In the Space: Above and Beyond episode "The Angriest Angel", an AI uses the phrase when discovered hiding under a floorplate.
 The Widespread Panic song "Saint Ex" contains the lyrics “Sit between the clouds for cover, Raindrops hide in the sea, Olly Olly Oxen Free, The bliss of anonymity”.

See also 
 Truce term

References

Children's street culture
Catchphrases